The 2005 South Asian Football Federation Gold Cup was an international football tournament held in Pakistan from 7 to 17 December 2005. The 8 national teams involved in the tournament were required to register a squad of 20 players. 

The position listed for each player is per the squad list in the official match reports by the SAFF. The age listed for each player is on 7 December 2005, the first day of the tournament. The numbers of caps and goals listed for each player do not include any matches played after the start of the tournament. The club listed is the club for which the player last played a competitive match prior to the tournament. The nationality for each club reflects the national association (not the league) to which the club is affiliated. A flag is included for coaches who are of a different nationality than their own national team.

Group A

Maldives

Coach:  Yordan Stoykov

Pakistan

Coach:  Salman Sharida

Afghanistan

Coach:  Klaus Stärk

Sri Lanka

Coach: Sampath Perera

Group B

Bangladesh

Coach:  Andrés Cruciani

India

Coach: Syed Nayeemuddin

Nepal

Coach:  Toshihiko Shiozawa

Bhutan

Coach: Khare Basnet

External links
RSSSF

References

SAFF Championship squads
SAFF Championship
Association football tournament squads